Lee Patterson is a former professional rugby league footballer who played in the 2000s.

Somewhat confusingly, there was a professional rugby league player named Lee Paterson, who played during the same period.

References

Living people
Batley Bulldogs players
Chorley Lynx players
Halifax R.L.F.C. players
Rochdale Hornets players
Rugby league centres
Rugby league wingers
St Helens R.F.C. players
Swinton Lions players
Year of birth missing (living people)
York City Knights players